An Electronic Logging Device (ELD or E-Log) is a piece of electronic hardware attached to a commercial motor vehicle engine to record driving hours. The driving hours of commercial drivers (truck and bus drivers) are typically regulated by a set of rules known as the hours of service (HOS) in the United States and as drivers' working hours in Europe. The Commercial Vehicle Driver Hours of Service Regulations vary in Canada and the United States.
 
An ELD monitors a vehicle’s engine to capture data on whether the engine is running, whether the vehicle is moving, distance driven, and duration of engine operation.
 
Previously, paper logs or electronic on-board recorders (EOBR) were used for hours of service tracking. While recorder logs improve the accuracy of the data, the lack of a consistent data format meant that the logs needed to be regenerated to an equivalent hardware ("paper") format for review and enforcement. The Record of Duty Status (RoDS) definition within the ELD legislation provides a consistent format for enforcement personnel to review, so the ELD Mandate was created.

The Federal Motor Carrier Safety Administration (FMCSA) announced the Final Rule of the ELD mandate, and ELD regulations being implemented in several phases with a compliance date of December 18, 2017. Fleets already equipped with loggers or recorders had until December 2019 to ensure compliance with the published specifications.

Before the final rule of the ELD mandate was announced, fleets used the Automatic On-Board Device (AOBRD), a much simpler version of the ELD device that did not provide fleets with many features. For instance, ELDs provide a standardized format and transfer process for roadside inspections, have more sophisticated location tracking, and enable drivers to accept or reject edits made to their driving logs – all of which are required under the ELD mandate.

As mentioned before, it became mandatory for fleets to transition from AOBRDs to ELDs.

References

Road haulage